Genocide is a 2000 Judas Priest compilation consisting of their first two albums, Rocka Rolla and Sad Wings of Destiny, plus a bonus track from the Sad Wings of Destiny sessions as well. Like several others in the past, Genocide was released under the label Gull, in an effort to "capitalize on Judas Priest's popularity." Judas Priest's management firmly states that people should not buy these compilations, because even though it would seem like a new album on the surface, it's just a re-issue of material already recorded.

Track listing

Tracks 1-10 were originally released as Rocka Rolla in 1974; "Diamonds & Rust" is included as a bonus track.

Disc two was originally released as Sad Wings of Destiny in 1976.

Personnel
Rob Halford - lead vocals, harmonica
K.K. Downing - guitar
Glenn Tipton - guitar, keyboards, backing vocals
Ian Hill - bass
John Hinch - drums (1-10 on disc 1)
Alan Moore - drums (11 on disc 1, 1-9 on disc 2)

References

Judas Priest compilation albums
2000 compilation albums